The doctrine of separation, also known as the doctrine of non-fellowship, is a belief among some Protestant religious groups that the members of a church should be separate from "the world" and not have association with those who are "of the world".  There are many scriptures in both the Old Testament and New Testament of the Bible that provide the basis for this doctrine.  For example:

Amos 3:3 – "Can two walk together except they be agreed?"
Ephesians 5:11 – "Have no fellowship with the unfruitful works of darkness…"
II Corinthians 6:14 "Be ye not unequally yoked together with unbelievers..."
John 17:13–16 "I am coming to you now, but I say these things while I am still in the world, so that they may have the full measure of my joy within them. I have given them your word and the world has hated them, for they are not of the world any more than I am of the world. My prayer is not that you take them out of the world but that you protect them from the evil one. They are not of the world, even as I am not of it."
Different groups vary widely in what to them constitutes separation.  Additionally, there is a distinction between first and second degree separation.  For example, many Christians want to live in a way that is distinct from the typical lifestyle of the world (first degree). This was supported by Dennis Costella when he said "We are in the world, but we are not to be a part of it." Exclusive Brethren are an Evangelical Protestant Christian who hold strongly to a doctrine of separation which means that they isolate themselves from those not of their community. A similar but less extreme form is the position held by Independent Fundamental Baptists and Bible Baptist churches.
Others would claim that not only should one separate from the world, but also from those Christians who would not separate themselves from the world (second degree).  Believers in second degree separation believe that Christians who are tied up with "the world" are themselves guilty of apostasy for their failure to adequately separate.

Practices and areas that should be separated under the more strict interpretations of the doctrine of separation include:

Mental Life: Thoughts, reading, attitudes
Physical Life: Dress, physical contact, entertainment, speech
Social Life: Friendships, courtship, career
Spiritual Life: Personal devotional life, fellowship with other Christians, the Church

The doctrine of separation often leads to ecclesiastical separatism, in which Christians leave Christian denominations that they believe are apostate (Rev. 18:4).

See also
Pauline privilege
Shunning

References

Christian ethics
Separatism
Christian fundamentalism